David Sklansky (born December 22, 1947) is an American professional poker player and author. An early writer on poker strategy, he is known for his mathematical approach to the game. His key work The Theory of Poker presents fundamental principles on which much later analysis is based.

Early years
Sklansky was born and raised in Teaneck, New Jersey, where he graduated from Teaneck High School in 1966. He attended the University of Pennsylvania, but dropped out before graduation. He returned to Teaneck and passed multiple Society of Actuaries exams by the age of 20, and worked for an actuarial firm.

Poker career
Sklansky is an authority on gambling. He has written and contributed to fourteen books on poker, blackjack, and general gambling.

Sklansky has won three World Series of Poker bracelets, two in 1982 ($800 Mixed Doubles with Dani Kelly, and $1,000 Draw Hi) and one in 1983 ($1,000 Limit Omaha Hi). He also won the Poker By The Book invitational event on the 2004 World Poker Tour, outlasting a table full of poker legends, which included Phil Hellmuth Jr, Mike Caro, T. J. Cloutier, and Mike Sexton, and then finally overcoming Doyle Brunson.

Sklansky attended the Wharton School of Business at the University of Pennsylvania for a year before leaving to become a professional gambler. He briefly took on a job as an actuary before embarking into poker. While on the job, he discovered a faster way to do some of the calculations and took that discovery to his boss. The boss told him he could go ahead and do it that way if he wanted but wouldn't pass on the information to the other workers. "In other words, I knew something no one else knew, but I got no recognition for it," Sklansky is quoted as saying in Al Alvarez's 1983 work The Biggest Game in Town. "In poker, if you're better than anyone else, you make immediate money. If there's something I know about the game that the other person doesn't, and if he's not willing to learn or can't understand, then I take his money."

As of 2015, his live tournament winnings exceed $1,350,000. He lives in Las Vegas, Nevada.

World Series of Poker bracelets

Publications
Sklansky has authored or co-authored 14 books on gambling theory and poker. Most of his books are published by Two Plus Two Publishing. His book cover art often features hand guns. His 1976 book Hold'em Poker was the first book widely available on the subject of hold'em poker. It's through these books that he popularized the concept of Sklansky Bucks (now often referred to as luck-adjusted winnings), which are used by professional poker players to this day.

 
 
 
 
 
 
 
 
 
 
 The Theory of Poker

References

External links
 Two Plus Two, publisher
 David Sklansky at World Poker Tour
 David Sklansky at Poker Listings
 

1947 births
American gambling writers
American male non-fiction writers
American poker players
Living people
Super Bowl of Poker event winners
Teaneck High School alumni
University of Pennsylvania alumni
World Poker Tour winners
World Series of Poker bracelet winners